Benjamin Franklin Fisher was an American Brevet Brigadier General who was a Chief Signal Officer of the Army of the Potomac during the Siege of Petersburg of the American Civil War. He was also known for being one of the escapees of the Libby Prison escape

Biography

Early years
Benjamin was born on November 21, 1834 at Spring Mills, Pennsylvania as the son of the Reverend Peter A. Fisher. Benjamin graduated from the Franklin & Marshall College and his early career consisted of being a attorney at Bucks County, Pennsylvania before the outbreak of the American Civil War.

American Civil War
When the war broke out, Fisher was mustered into the Union Army on July 1861 at Doylestown, Pennsylvania as a 1st Lieutenant as part of Company H of the 3rd Pennsylvania Reserve Regiment however he was then reassigned to the Signal Corps and being promoted to Captain on July 7, 1862. He would then go on to participate in the Peninsula Campaign along with Joseph Hooker. He would also participate at the Maryland campaign as an observer before being made a Chief Signal Officer on June 1863. Fisher then went on to participate at the Battle of Chancellorsville and was praised for his command during the battle as he was one of the first commanders to report Robert E. Lee's movements up the Rappahannock to his home state of Pennsylvania. Afterwards, he left the HQ at Fairfax Station, Virginia to report to Alfred Pleasonton who was at Aldie, Virginia but on the way, he was ambushed and captured by John S. Mosby's men and was held as a prisoner of war at Libby Prison.

Prison escape

During his time as a prisoner, Fisher befriended Colonel Thomas E. Rose as Rose formed a working party with other prisoners in order to break out of the prison. One day at ten in the evening, Fisher and his party crossed the Chickahominy River and passed by the guard at Meadow bridge. On the next day, they hid under a pine thicket several miles beyond the river and would travel at night, avoiding the roads and hid in the thickets and jungles of the Chickahominy swamp during the day. When they reached the vicinity of the White House, a severe snowstorm occurred which caused Fisher and his party to lie for 2 days in order to avoid detection by the Confederates, who were actively searching for the missing men. On the evening of the 18th of February, Fisher's party were caught by a Confederate search party and fighting broke out with Fisher merely escaping out of sheer determination through the thickets and swamps and arriving on Williamsburg, Virginia on the 21st of February along with some other party members that followed Fisher. They were shortly then rescued by Benjamin Butler's cavalry who were searching for the escapees. For his services during the break out, Fisher was promoted to Major of the Signal Corps and re-assigned as the Chief Signal Officer of the United States, relieving William J. L. Nicodemus.

Later years
His post war life consisted of Fisher continuing his legal career in Philadelphia, going as far as becoming a registrar of Pennsylvania's 3rd congressional district. He died on Valley Forge at the Schuylkill.

See also
List of American Civil War brevet generals (Union)

References

1834 births
1915 deaths
People from Centre County, Pennsylvania
Members of the Pennsylvania House of Representatives
Union Army colonels
Union Army generals
People of Pennsylvania in the American Civil War
19th-century American lawyers
Franklin & Marshall College alumni